The members of the 21st Manitoba Legislature were elected in the Manitoba general election held in April 1941. The legislature sat from December 9, 1941, to September 8, 1945.

A coalition government of all four legal political parties in the province was formed in December 1940. John Bracken served as Premier until 1943, when he entered federal politics. Stuart Garson succeeded Bracken as Premier.

There was no official opposition until the Co-operative Commonwealth Federation left the coalition in 1943 and Seymour Farmer became Leader of the Opposition.

Robert Hawkins served as speaker for the assembly.

There were five sessions of the 21st Legislature:

Roland Fairbairn McWilliams was Lieutenant Governor of Manitoba.

Members of the Assembly 
The following members were elected to the assembly in 1941:

Notes:

By-elections 
By-elections were held to replace members for various reasons:

Notes:

References 

Terms of the Manitoba Legislature
1941 establishments in Manitoba
1945 disestablishments in Manitoba